Robert Bainbridge Taylor (born 30 April 1942) is a former England rugby player and past president of the Rugby Football Union. He is from Northampton, England, and studied at King Alfred's College (now University of Winchester) from 1960 - 1963.

He captained England in one international. He was also the Northampton coach and a referee for East Midlands.

Taylor was a PE and mathematics teacher at Wellingborough Grammar School from 1964 until 1975. He was PE teacher at Lings Upper School in Northampton from 1975

In 1995 he was appointed Hon Secretary of Northampton RFC and served as president 1993-95. He has represented Northampton and the East Midlands on numerous committees and has served on several national committees. He was appointed to serve for one year as President of the Rugby Football Union in July 2007.

References

External links 
 Lions profile

1942 births
Living people
English rugby union players
British & Irish Lions rugby union players from England
England international rugby union players
Rugby union flankers
English rugby union administrators
Northampton Saints players
Alumni of the University of Winchester
Rugby union players from Northampton